Nordine Ben Ali (July 19, 1919 – May 15, 1996) was an Algerian-French association football player and manager.

He played as a midfielder and was part of the Girondins ASP side that won the Coupe de France in 1941, as well as reaching the final of the Coupe de France in 1943. He was player-manager of Chamois Niortais for three seasons from 1957 until 1960. He also coached Dijon.

Ben Ali died Lourdes, France in May 1996 at the age of 76.

References

External links
Nordine Ben Ali profile at chamoisfc79.fr

1919 births
1996 deaths
French footballers
French football managers
Algerian footballers
Algerian football managers
AS Monaco FC players
Chamois Niortais F.C. players
Chamois Niortais F.C. managers
Association football midfielders
FC Girondins de Bordeaux players
Le Mans FC players
Le Havre AC players
Ligue 1 players
Ligue 2 players
RC Strasbourg Alsace players
Footballers from Algiers
People from Bologhine
Migrants from French Algeria to France